The Mourning Mothers (also known as the Mothers of Laleh Park) are a group of Iranian women whose spouses or children were killed by government agents in the protests following the disputed Iranian presidential election of 2009.  The group also includes relatives of victims of earlier human rights abuses, including mass executions during the 1980s. The principal demand of the Mourning Mothers is government accountability for the deaths, arrests, and disappearances of their children. The mothers meet on Saturdays in Laleh Park in Tehran, and are often chased by the police and arrested.

The Mourning Mothers have called for the revocation of death sentences for political prisoners, the release of prisoners of conscience, and trials of "those who were responsible for and who ordered their children's murders." In 2009, Iranian Nobel Laureate Shirin Ebadi urged women around the world to show solidarity with the Mourning Mothers by wearing black and meeting in neighborhood parks on Saturdays from 7 to 8 pm.

Arrests and imprisonment
On January 9, 2010, more than thirty Mourning Mothers were arrested by security agents at Laleh Park. According to eyewitnesses, the mothers were attacked by over 100 police and plainclothes agents, who violently forced the mothers into police vans.  These arrests were widely condemned by human rights organizations. The mothers were released from prison on January 14, 2010.

On December 27, 2011, group member Zhila Karamzadeh-Makvandi was arrested and sentenced to two years in Evin Prison for "founding an illegal organization" and "acting against state security". Amnesty International protested her imprisonment, designating her a prisoner of conscience "held solely for her peaceful activities as a member of the Mothers of Laleh Park". On April 4, 2012, group member Mansoureh Behkish was informed she was sentenced to four years' imprisonment for her activities with the group. Another member, Leyla
Seyfollahi, and a male supporter, Nader Ahsani, were sentenced to two years' imprisonment apiece, but had not yet been summoned to begin their sentences.

See also
 Ladies in White
 Mothers of Khavaran
 Mothers of the Plaza de Mayo
 Saturday Mothers
 Iranian women
 List of famous Persian women
 List of peace activists
 Intellectual movements in Iran
 Persian women's movement
 Islamic feminism
 Sohrab Aarabi

References

Iranian women activists
Iranian human rights activists
Human rights organisations based in Iran
Motherhood
Tehran
Women's organisations based in Iran